Sancho of Aragon may refer to:

Sancho Ramírez (d. 1094), king of Aragon from 1063 and king of Pamplona from 1076
Sancho, Count of Provence (d. 1223), regent of Aragon from 1214 to 1218
Sancho of Aragon (archbishop of Toledo) (d. 1275), archbishop from 1266
Sancho of Aragon (died 1416), master of the Order of Alcántara from 1409